Claughton railway station served the village of Claughton in the City of Lancaster district of Lancashire, England. 

The station was located near Low Lane at a level crossing, but was only in service for a short period (passenger traffic ceasing as early as May 1853). A private goods siding serving the nearby brickworks was laid soon after the 1923 Grouping by the LMS.

Freight services finished the following year in June 1967 and the track was then dismantled. The formation has since been returned to agricultural land east of Caton. The station house survives as a private residence.

References

Disused railway stations in Lancaster
Former Midland Railway stations
Railway stations in Great Britain opened in 1849